The Bethany Swedes (historically the Bethany Terrible Swedes) are the athletic teams that represent Bethany College, located in Lindsborg, Kansas, in intercollegiate sports as a member of the National Association of Intercollegiate Athletics (NAIA), primarily competing in the Kansas Collegiate Athletic Conference (KCAC) since the 1902–03 academic year.

Varsity teams
Bethany competes in 22 intercollegiate varsity sports: Men's sports include baseball, basketball, cross country, football, golf, soccer, tennis, track & field (indoor and outdoor) and wrestling; while women's sports include basketball, cross country, golf, soccer, softball, tennis, track & field (indoor and outdoor) and volleyball; and co-ed sports include cheerleading, dance and eSports.

Football

The school plays football. Former coach Ted Kessinger was named to the College Football Hall of Fame in 2010 and former coach Bennie Owen was inducted in 1951.

Tennis (men's)
Despite having a school population under 1,000, the Bethany men's tennis team has received national recognition. Bethany men's tennis team won 52 Kansas Collegiate Athletic Conference championships, including a streak of 26 KCAC titles in a row.  The Bethany College men won 97 straight KCAC matches in a row under head coach Vic Bateman, undefeated in 11 straight years of KCAC Conference play. Under Bateman the men's tennis team reached the Elite 8 at the NAIA nationals and was ranked one of the top ten tennis programs in the country.

References

External links